One Rat Short is a short digital animation, written and directed by Alex Weil.  It was awarded a Best of Show award at the SIGGRAPH 2006 Computer Animation Festival.

External links 
 One Rat Short at IMDB
 The Not So Rat Race (interview with Weil at NewEnglandFilm.com)

2006 computer-animated films
American animated short films
2006 films
2006 short films
2000s American films